The Seattle trolleybus system forms part of the public transportation network in the city of Seattle, Washington, operated by King County Metro. At present in Seattle, a very common alternative term for trolleybus is trolley.

Of the five trolleybus systems currently operating in the U.S., the Seattle system is the second largest (by ridership and fleet size), after the San Francisco system.

History

From tracks to tires 

The first trolleybus to operate on Seattle's streets was in 1937. It was brought to the city for a demonstration to gain public support for a plan to replace the debt-ridden streetcar and cable car system with a "trackless trolley" system. The demonstration was a success, but still reeling from the impacts of the Great Depression, Seattle voters rejected the plan in a municipal election on March 9, 1937.

In 1939, Seattle received a federal loan that allowed the city to retire the debts from the streetcar and cable car system. Management of system was turned over to an independent commission and renamed the Seattle Transit System (STS). The commission immediately began construction on overhead wire and ordered 235 new trolleybuses, the first of which started arriving in March 1940.
 The first trolleybus went into revenue service April 28, 1940, on route 13 which ran along 19th Avenue in Capitol Hill (which is still served by trolleybuses today on route 12). The system expanded again during World War II, when the Office of Defense Transportation gave Seattle more trolleybuses to meet increased wartime transportation demands, bringing the fleet to 307 coaches. Ridership reached an all-time high 130 million riders in 1944. After the war, ridership on the trolleybus system declined as many American families began purchasing automobiles.

An uncertain future 
The city's aging trolleybuses were spiffed up, and the overhead wire expanded in 1962 to serve the World's Fair, but citywide the Seattle Transit System was increasingly abandoning the trolley routes. One year later in 1963, the commission retired 175 trolleybuses and tore down the overhead wire in the north end of the city and West Seattle. A group of citizens protested the abandonment of the trolley routes with an initiative to voters in 1964, but it failed at the polls.

By the end of the 1960s, the trolleybus system had been reduced to just 59 coaches operating on 30 miles of overhead wire. Seattle Transit System management defended the move claiming cost savings from using diesel-powered buses, the high cost of electrifying new routes and the lack of any new trolley coaches on the market. Under fire from the public, the commission ordered an independent study. That study contradicted the claims of management, concluding that trolleybuses perform better than diesel powered buses on Seattle's hills and that operating costs were comparable (except for overhead wire maintenance).

By 1970, the Seattle Transit System was facing mounting financial problems, leading voters to eliminate the commission and turn over operation of the system to the city. Voters spoke once again in 1972 when they approved the merger of the now city-owned Seattle Transit System and the privately held Metropolitan Transit Corporation into a single, countywide transit system under the auspices of the Municipality of Metropolitan Seattle (better known as Metro).  Metro had promised voters that it would keep the trolleybus system if the transfer of the transit system to Metro was approved. There had been "prolonged and vocal [public] opposition to the 1970 conversions" of routes 3 and 4 to motor buses, leading city officials to begin working to ensure that the system would survive under Metro.  Furthermore, the City was interested in expanding the system, in light of the fuel shortages and price increases observed during the 1973 oil crisis, and in 1974 it formally asked Metro to add 27.5 route mile and up to 63 vehicles. The proposed expansion was later scaled-back slightly, but the final plan agreed to by the City and Metro would eventually see the system expand from 55 vehicles to 109 and from 32 route miles to 55 by 1981, in addition to replacement of all of the old fleet and infrastructure with new.

Rebirth of the trolleybus system 

The new Metro Transit began operation on January 1, 1973, and in 1974 it began working on fleshing-out the plans to rehabilitate and expand Seattle's trolleybus network, hiring a consulting firm in 1975 to carry out the technical aspects of the design. On January 21, 1978, the system was shut down, and while passengers rode diesel-powered coaches, crews began installing new overhead wire, switches, and a new power distribution system. In 1977, Metro placed an order for 109 AM General trolleys, the first new trolleybuses for the city since the 1940s. The first of these was delivered in April 1979. The first routes were back in trolley service on September 15, 1979. Over the next two years, more routes were placed back into service as construction was completed and new coaches delivered. By the summer of 1981, the entire trolley system was back up and running.

In addition to modernization, the 1978–1981 rebuilding included expansion, resurrecting several closed routes and adding a long, new route to Ballard.  These included former routes 3-North Queen Anne – Jefferson Park and 4-East Queen Anne – Montlake, which STS had closed in 1970.  The Downtown-to-Queen Anne portions of those routes were reinstated with the same route numbers. The Jefferson Park trolleybus route was reinstated as route 1, connected to route 1-Kinnear, but extended from Spokane Street to Dawson Street,  farther south than the old route had run.  The former route 4-Montlake was revived as route 43, Downtown–Montlake–University District and extended west with a new, never-before-existing section of trolleybus route between the University District and Ballard.  Former route 9-Broadway was also replaced by route 7 and extended across the University Bridge to the University District, returning trolleybus service to much of former route 7-15th Avenue NE, which had been abandoned as a trolleybus service in 1963. Other corridors were also considered but ultimately rejected for trolleybus service, including Aurora Avenue.

By 1981, Metro started to consider the future of the remaining 1940s trolleybuses, which had been in storage since the beginning of the system rehabilitation in 1978. A group of employees founded the Metro Employees Historic Vehicle Association (MEHVA) in December 1981 to preserve, restore and operate some of the vintage coaches. Under the agreement, Metro maintained ownership of the historic fleet, providing insurance coverage, storage space, work space and spare parts on an 'as available' basis. The first trolleybus to be restored by MEHVA was 1944 Pullman-Standard No. 1005, and regular public excursions around the trolleybus system with No. 1005 began in 1985. In the summer of the following year, MEHVA scheduled three four-hour excursions and six one-hour trips, but the number was much smaller in subsequent years, with three or four per year.  Since the early 1990s, MEHVA has normally operated two vintage-trolleybus excursions per year: a four-hour daytime trip and a 2 ½-hour evening trip, and this pattern continues as of 2017.  Operation of historic trolleybuses has also taken place for special events, such as the commemoration of the 60th anniversary of the Seattle trolleybus system, in April 2000. In the years since MEHVA has continued to add additional trolley and motor buses to the historic fleet.

 
Sixty-foot-long articulated trolleybuses were added to the fleet in 1986–87. The 46 coaches, designed by MAN of West Germany and built at a North Carolina MAN plant, were assigned to the busy routes 7 and 43, equivalent to present-day routes 7, 49, 43 and 44 (before a 1993 splitting of route 43 into routes 43 and 44, and a 2005 splitting of route 7 into routes 7 and 49), all of which continue to use articulated trolleybuses today. These were the first articulated trolleybuses in North America, other than single experimental vehicles or manufacturer demonstrators on loan, and they began to enter service in April 1987.

The construction of the Downtown Seattle Transit Tunnel under 3rd Avenue beginning in 1986 forced many of the trolleybus routes to be rerouted to 1st Avenue for several years. Once construction was finished, the trolleybuses returned to Third Avenue and the tunnel opened on September 15, 1990. The tunnel introduced the dual-mode Breda DuoBus 350 (ADPB 350) coaches that operated on overhead wire underground, which drove the center axle, and diesel on the surface, which drove the rear axle.

The Municipality of Metropolitan Seattle was disbanded in 1994 after the public voted to merge it with the King County government. After the merger, Metro Transit became a division of King County's Department of Transportation.

In September 1997, King County Metro expanded the trolleybus system, electrifying Route 70 between downtown and the University District via Eastlake Avenue E. The $19 million project, primarily funded by a grant from the Federal Transit Administration, was the first modern expansion of trolley wire (excluding the downtown bus tunnel) and incorporated public art as required by city ordinances.

Between 2001 and 2003, Metro purchased 100 Gillig Phantom coaches to replace the AM General trolleys. These coaches were delivered as "gliders," meaning that while they looked complete from the outside, internally the coach lacked a propulsion system. Metro removed the motors, propulsion controls and other components from the AM General trolleys, sent them to Alstom to be refurbished and then reinstalled them into the new Gillig bodies along with new fiberglass trolley poles from Vossloh Kiepe. The repurposing of the propulsion system from the AM General trolleybuses saved $200,000 per coach, totaling $20 million for the entire fleet.

After the Breda coaches used in the transit tunnel were replaced by hybrid electric buses, Metro converted 59 coaches into electric-only trolleybuses between 2004 and 2007. As a part of the conversion, Metro removed the diesel motors from the coaches and installed new Vossloh-Kiepe current collection equipment, fiberglass trolley poles to replace the steel poles, new interior upholstery, a new driver's compartment, and new LED destination signs to replace the Flip-dot destination and LED turn signals and tail lights to replace the incandesant turn signals and tail lights. These converted Breda coaches were renumbered 4200-4258 and replaced the aging MAN articulated trolleybuses.

The unique fleet of converted Breda coaches and Gillig coaches with recycled 1979 propulsion systems saved money for Metro in the early 2000s, but after a decade on the streets of Seattle the buses became less reliable and more expensive to maintain. By the end of the decade, Metro started to look at purchasing an all-new trolley fleet.

Recommitting to the trolleybus system 
King County Metro's plan to replace the trolley fleet came into question as the nationwide economic downturn caused a steep and prolonged drop in the sales tax revenues that Metro used to fund its operations. As part of an effort to cut costs across the agency, a 2009 King County Auditor's Office report recommended replacing the trolleybuses with hybrid diesel-electric coaches. The audit concluded that electric trolley fleet costs $31.2 million a year to own and operate while the hybrids would cost $22.6 million per year, a savings of $8.7 million per year. The auditor acknowledged that the report did not consider the value of the overhead wire or social and environmental considerations, such as increased tailpipe emissions or increased noise.

Facing a situation similar to the 1970s and pressure from the public, King County Metro commissioned an independent evaluation of the trolleybus system. That 2011 evaluation disproved the audit's findings on the trolleybus system. The report found that the 2009 audit did not consider that a longer life-span could be expected for new trolleybuses (15 years) compared to hybrid diesel-electric buses (12 years) and did not take into account that the Federal Transit Administration provides fixed guideway funding for the overhead trolley wire. The report concluded that the annualized life-cycle cost for each trolleybus is $11.8 million per year, compared to $15.5 million per year for a hybrid diesel-electric coach, a savings of $3.7 million per year.

After the results of the evaluation, Metro placed an order in June 2013 with New Flyer for 141 Xcelsior trolleybuses to replace the Gillig and Breda trolleybuses. The Xcelsior XT40 and XT60 are the first trolleybuses in King County Metro's fleet to have a low floor design, a wheelchair ramp (instead of a lift), air conditioning and an auxiliary power unit (that allow buses to operate off-wire for at least 3 miles). Metro says that the New Flyer buses use 25 to 30 percent less energy than the electric trolley buses they replaced, partly because of a regenerative braking system will allow coaches to capture the energy generated during braking and feed it back into the overhead wires. The Xcelsior trolleybuses have a distinct purple and yellow livery, that distinguish them from Metro's hybrid diesel-electric and diesel-powered buses.

The initial order was for 86 of the 40-foot coaches (model XT40) and 55 of the 60-foot, articulated coaches (model XT60). The order would have decreased the total number of trolleybuses in the fleet by 18 coaches since at the time the order was placed, Metro was planning to cut service (as a part of the cost-saving measures amid the economic downturn). Instead, the agency ended up expanding service after Seattle voters approved a transportation benefit district. As a result, the order was increased to 110 model XT40 buses and 64 model XT60 buses in early 2015.

Two prototype Xcelsior XT40 trolleybuses (Nos. 4300 and 4301) were delivered in October 2014 for evaluation and testing and the first Xcelsior XT40 coaches entered service on August 19, 2015, followed by the first Xcelsior XT60 on January 29, 2016.

After years of planning, King County Metro installed a new section of trolley wire near Seattle Pacific University in North Queen Anne and placed it into service in March 2017. Before this project, coaches used on Routes 3 and 4 laid over in residential areas of Queen Anne. This new wire allowed Routes 3 and 4 to join Route 13 in serving Seattle Pacific University, providing more frequent service to the campus.

Recommitting to the trolleybus system

On March 23, 2020, King County Metro indefinitely suspended several bus routes in response to the COVID-19 pandemic, which included route 47. Route 47 is still suspended as of March 2022.

With the opening of the Northgate Link Light Rail extension on October 2, 2021, routes 43, 44, 49, and 70 serve the U District Station using the loop on NE 47th Street and 12th Avenue NE as construction of new wire on NE 43rd Street has been delayed until early 2022. Wire on 15th Avenue NE north of NE 45th Street is temporarily disused until route 48 is electrified.

Future expansion
In recent years, the Seattle Department of Transportation (SDOT) and King County Metro have presented proposals to expand trolleybus service throughout Seattle by building new wire.

The largest project currently underway is along 23rd Avenue through the Central District. As part of a project to improve the arterial, SDOT is adding new, stronger streetlight poles that will be capable of supporting the weight of trolley wire. The new poles will enable the electrification of route 48, which runs on 23rd Avenue through the Central District and has two segments without wires totaling , the rest shared with other existing trolleybus routes. In 2019, after a delay to the project, Metro indicated that the remaining work to convert route 48 to trolleybuses was planned to take place in 2021 and 2022, for opening in May 2023, but new delays were encountered subsequently, and by 2022 the projected date for the conversion of route 48 to trolleybuses had been pushed back to mid-2026.

The Move Seattle ballot measure approved by voters in November 2015 includes a planned expansion of the RapidRide system. Four of the seven future RapidRide corridors are proposed to use electric trolleybus technology, utilizing the existing network of trolley wire and in some cases expanding it:
 RapidRide J Line (formerly Roosevelt RapidRide Line) (2026): U-District – South Lake Union – Downtown Seattle via Roosevelt Way/11th Avenue and Eastlake Avenue (utilizes wire currently used by Route 70)
 RapidRide R Line (formerly Rainier RapidRide Line) (TBD): Downtown Seattle – Mount Baker – Rainier Valley via Jackson St & Rainier Ave (utilizes wire currently used by Route 7)
 Market RapidRide Line (Cancelled): Ballard – Wallingford – U-District – Laurelhurst via Market St and 45th Ave (utilizes and expands wire currently used by Route 44)
 23rd RapidRide Line (Cancelled): Mount Baker – Central District – U-District via 23rd Ave & Rainier Ave (utilizes wire currently used by Route 7 and under construction for Route 48)

Additionally, the G Line (Downtown Seattle – First Hill – Central District via Madison Street, projected to open in 2024) had long been planned to use trolleybuses, using already-existing wire currently used by Route 12 plus some new sections of wire, but in March 2019 SDOT announced that hybrid buses would be used instead. The reason for the change was that Metro, who is tasked with acquiring the vehicles for the G Line, was unable to find any North American manufacturer willing to build articulated trolleybuses with doors on both sidesa G Line project requirementthat could handle the very steep grades on the westernmost portion of the line (18–19%).

SDOT has also identified several possible future trolley wire expansions in its Transit Master Plan, including two key projects: electrifying Denny Way between Uptown and Olive Way (which would allow a portion of busy Route 8 to operate with trolleybuses) and electrifying Yesler between 2nd and 9th Avenues, and on 9th Avenue from Yesler to Jefferson (which would allow Routes 3 and 4 to travel on a less congested path between Downtown and Harborview Medical Center).

Routes

, 15 trolleybus routes operate in Seattle. In the following table, routes are ordered by number, principal streets traveled on are italicized and major destinations and neighborhoods are listed.

"Night Owl" service operates on routes 3, 7, 36 & 49. Additionally, special diesel "Night Owl" routes run over portions of some of the trolley routes, during the overnight hours.

Notes:

Fleet

Current

The Metro trolleybus fleet presently comprises two types,  and  articulated buses. These buses accrue a total of 3.7 million miles each year (62.8% on 40-foot buses, 37.2% on 60-foot buses) and are the cleanest and quietest buses in Metro's fleet.

Metro's current trolleybuses are New Flyer Xcelsior coaches that were delivered beginning in 2015. These 174 coaches have a low floor design, a wheelchair ramp (instead of a lift) and air conditioning. The new trolleybuses are built with motors from Škoda and a Vossloh Kiepe electric drive system, including an auxiliary power unit (lithium ion phosphate batteries) that allow buses to operate off-wire for at least 3 miles, a first for Metro.

Former

1940–1978

For the opening of the system in 1940, the Seattle Transit System purchased trolleybuses from two different manufacturers. The Twin Coach Company provided 135 vehicles, while the J. G. Brill Company provided 100. All but the first Brill vehicles were built, under license, by Pacific Car and Foundry (PCF), in the nearby city of  Renton, and are commonly referred to as PCF-Brill vehicles or simply Brills. Strong ridership growth during World War II, when the city's economy was booming, brought a need for additional vehicles. Forty-two more Twin Coach trolleybuses were bought in 1942–1943, followed by 30 Pullman-Standard vehicles in 1944. These were the last new trolleybuses acquired until the late 1970s. The fleet's size peaked at that time, at 307, making Seattle's trolleybus fleet the 12th-largest in the United States.

With the abandonment of several trolleybus routes in 1963, the remaining Brill trolleybuses were retired.  The system was reduced to only about half its former size.  Additional route closures in 1965 (route 11-East Madison) and 1970 (routes 3-North Queen Anne–Jefferson Park and 4-East Queen Anne–Montlake) reduced the active fleet to only 53 coaches by 1971.  In 1974, when a few Twin Coaches returned to service, the entire remaining fleet of 57 was renumbered into the series 600–656, comprising 34 of the 1940 Twins (600–633), eight of the slightly larger 1943 Twins (634–641) and all 15 of the 1944 Pullmans (642–656).  Not long afterward, a shortage of serviceable vehicles prompted Metro Transit to re-acquire four trolleybuses that previously had been donated to museums. These included two Twins, one Pullman and, most notably, a PCF-Brill—a type of trolleybus that had not been in the fleet in more than a decade. Brill #798 returned from the by-then-defunct Trolleyland Museum (Centralia, Washington) in April 1975. Metro immediately repainted it into its original Seattle Transit System paint scheme only used during the 1940s, and it returned to regular service in November 1975. In 1978, Brill 798 was officially designated a Seattle Landmark by the city's Landmarks Preservation Board.

Metro's decision in 1974 to rebuild and expand the entire trolleybus system included the replacement of the entire trolleybus fleet. All remaining 59 vehicles from the 1940s fleet were permanently retired when the system shut down for rebuilding at the end of the service day on January 20, 1978. Most were kept in storage until late 1981, when 55 were declared surplus and designated for auction or donation to museums. Following the formation of the Metro Employees Historic Vehicle Association in that year, Metro agreed to preserve examples of all four types – including the single Brill, #798 – for eventual restoration and operation by MEHVA. The preserved vehicles were No. 798, the 1940 PCF-Brill; No. 622 (originally No. 905, and given an earlier number, 643, after restoration), a 1940 Twin Coach 41GWFT; No. 636, a 1943 Twin Coach 44GTT; and No. 655 (restored to its original number, 1005, after restoration), a 1944 Pullman-Standard. To this day, each of the coaches remain in Metro's historic fleet. No. 643's original number, 905, was restored in 2018.

1979–1999
For the reopening of the rebuilt and expanded system in 1979–1981, Metro purchased 109  trolleybuses from AM General. They were the system's first wheelchair lift-equipped trolleybuses. The vehicles were delivered in 1979 and first entered service with the reopening of the first two routes (2 and 10), on September 15, 1979.  The last units entered service with the opening of the last two routes (7 and 43), on May 23, 1981.

With electrification of motor bus routes 15 and 18 planned, in 1984 Metro placed an order with MAN, of Germany, for 46 articulated (bending) trolleybuses. Although Metro's fleet already included about 350 articulated diesel buses from the same manufacturer, these were its first articulated trolleybuses.  Moreover, they were the first such vehicles in North America. A prototype was delivered in January 1986, and the remaining 45 followed in 1987.  They began to enter service in April 1987.  The planned conversion of routes 15 and 18 to trolleybuses was later deferred, as funds needed to be diverted to the downtown tunnel project, and was ultimately canceled.  The arrival of the new articulated trolleybuses instead led to some AM General trolleybuses being placed into storage. All 46 MAN trolleybuses were taken out of service in November 1987 because of a braking problem, and remained out of service for a full year while Metro worked on solving the problem. They began to return to service in November 1988.

For the Downtown Seattle Transit Tunnel (DSTT) project, the City Council and Metro chose a plan that would use articulated, dual-mode buses that would run as trolleybuses in the tunnel and as diesel buses outside the tunnel.  Metro borrowed a prototype Renault articulated, dual-mode bus from its French manufacturer in 1982–1983 to evaluate the technology and gain experience with it.  The vehicle was operated in regular service on every trolleybus route and several motorbus routes, between November 1982 and the end of 1983. Metro ultimately awarded a contract for an order of 236 dual-mode buses to Breda Costruzioni Ferroviarie in October 1986, at a cost of $133 million, subsequently approved by the federal government's UMTA in November. Metro did not intend to use these vehicles on any of its surface trolleybus routes, only on the planned "tunnel routes", which were effectively diesel-bus routes and only used trolley propulsion inside the  transit tunnel.  However, almost two decades later, some of the Breda vehicles were converted to electric-only and used on the surface trolleybus routes.

The first of four prototype Breda dual-mode buses was delivered in November 1988. For the 232 production-series vehicles, Breda shipped the bodies from Italy to the Seattle area and then completed their assembly and fitting-out at space it leased in the Seattle suburb of Issaquah. That was done to comply with the Buy America Act, requiring that at least half the value of foreign-built transit vehicles be U.S. content. Prototypes 5000–5002 (No. 5003 was kept in Italy) temporarily entered service on regular Metro routes in January 1990 – initially diesel routes, but on trolleybus route 43 a month later – to enable Metro to accrue experience with them prior to the opening of the DSTT.  The first production-series vehicle was accepted in March 1990.  By the opening of the DSTT, on September 15, 1990, 55 Breda dual-mode buses had been accepted for service, and all Bredas were used exclusively on "tunnel routes" from then on.

2000–2016

The next major change to the trolleybus fleet occurred in the early 2000s, as the AM Generals and MANs would both be due for replacement around that time.  In 2001–2003, Metro acquired 100 new  Gillig Phantom trolleys, to replace its 109 AM General trolleys. The drive train of the AM General coaches was placed into the new Gillig bodies along with new electronics from Alstom, saving approximately $200,000 per coach. But as the trolleybuses aged, Metro said the 1979 propulsion systems had become less reliable and more expensive to maintain. Installation of the part-new, part-overhauled propulsion equipment was carried out by Metro's own maintenance employees.  The first two Gillig trolleybuses, not yet equipped with propulsion, arrived in June and August 2001.  The first propulsion set arrived on August 23, and Metro began installing it immediately. These two vehicles, Nos. 4100–4101, later became the first Gilligs to enter service, on January 22, 2002.  The 98 production-series vehicles were delivered between 2001 and early 2003.  The last day of service for any AM General trolleybuses was March 27, 2003, and the last Gillig entered service on April 15, 2003.

To replace the MAN articulated trolleybuses, Metro converted 59 of the 236 Breda dual-mode buses to trolley-only propulsion in 2004–2007, renumbered 4200–4258 and began using them for regular service on surface trolleybus routes for the first time.  In the downtown tunnel, new hybrid electric buses had started to replace the dual-mode buses in June 2004, and the last use of a dual-mode bus in the tunnel occurred on January 24, 2005, on which date only a single dual-mode bus was in service (#5169 on routes 71/72/73).  Before deciding to proceed with this conversion program, Metro made a trial conversion.  Between fall 2001 and early 2002, dual-mode bus 5101 was converted to electric-only, and it entered service on the surface trolleybus system in February 2002.  Later, when Metro decided to proceed with a conversion program of several vehicles, it adopted a planned fleet-number series of 4200–4258, and No. 5101 was renumbered 4200 in 2004.  The retirement of the MAN trolleys began in 2004, and the last day of service for the type was July 25, 2007.

The mid-2000s transition left the trolleybus fleet with 100 standard 40-foot Gillig vehicles and 59 articulated Breda vehicles.  Those vehicles were predicted to reach the end of their cost-effective service lives around 2012–2014, and in 2009 Metro proposed abandoning the trolleybus system when the last Gillig and Breda trolleybuses were retired.  However, additional studies and strong public opposition to the proposal ultimately resulted in Metro's decision to purchase another fleet of new trolleybuses to replace the old vehicles.  In June 2013, Metro placed an order with New Flyer for 141 Xcelsior trolleybuses. Eighty-six were to be 40-foot vehicles (model XT40) and 55 were to be 60-foot, articulated vehicles (model XT60). Because of the expansion of service made possible by Seattle's new transportation benefit district, in early 2015 the order was increased to 110 model XT40 buses and 64 model XT60 buses. The Xcelsior trolleys are the first low-floor trolleys in Metro's fleet and the first to be air-conditioned.  Two prototype buses, XT40 Nos. 4300 and 4301, were delivered in October 2014 for evaluation and testing.  Delivery of the production-series vehicles began in 2015, starting with the 40-foot units, the first of which entered service in August 2015. The prototype XT60 articulated unit was received by Metro on June 1, 2015, and the production-series vehicles began arriving in December 2015, with the first day of service for the type being January 29, 2016.  The New Flyer trolleybuses gradually replaced the older vehicles in 2015 and 2016. The last day of service for Breda trolleybuses was October 27, 2016, after more than 26 years of use (the first 15 as dual-mode buses).  The last day of service for any Gillig trolleybuses was November 29, 2016.

Preserved
 
The Metro Employees Historic Vehicle Association (MEHVA) has preserved and restored several vintage trolleybuses from the system's past fleet. These include No. 798, a 1940 PCF-Brill; No. 643 (originally No. 905), a 1940 Twin Coach 41GWFT; No. 1005, a 1944 Pullman-Standard; No. 1008, a 1979 AM General; No. 5034, a 1990 Breda dual-mode bus; and, No. 4195, a 2002 Gillig.  Also preserved by MEHVA, but not restored, is No. 636, a 1943 Twin Coach 44GTT (a different model than No. 643).

MEHVA did not preserve one of Metro's MAN articulated trolleybuses, but one of those vehicles – No. 4020 – joined the collection of the Illinois Railway Museum (IRM), near Chicago, and is able to operate under the museum's trolleybus wire. IRM has also preserved two other Seattle trolleybuses, No. 633, a 1940 Twin Coach and No. 4123, a 2002 Gillig. No. 604, a 1940 Twin Coach 41GWFT and No. 648, a 1944 Pullman-Standard have been preserved at the Oregon Electric Railway Museum, but since the facility does not have trolleybus wire, they are not able to operate there.

Operations

Garages

Seattle's trolleybus fleet is operated out of Atlantic Base in SoDo, one of seven bus garages (known locally as bases) owned by the agency. Atlantic Base was completed in early 1941 and was built specifically to house and maintain trolleybuses.

The system originally had two garages, called "stations" by Seattle Transit. Jefferson Station, a former streetcar barn built in 1910 or 1907 and located in Seattle's Central District, opened for trolleybuses in 1940.  Atlantic Station, at the same location as today's Atlantic Base, opened in 1941. Following service reductions in 1963 and 1970, Jefferson garage was closed in July 1970, except for use by overhead line maintenance crews and for vehicle storage.  All trolleybuses were then operated out of Atlantic garage until 1974, when they moved to Jefferson Base.

When the system reopened in 1979 after its almost-two-years shutdown for rebuilding, Jefferson Base remained Metro's sole trolleybus garage, but a move back to Atlantic was planned.  In 1981–1982, the old maintenance building and wash building at Atlantic Base, which by this time had been renamed Central Base, were replaced by new buildings, and the entire facility was reequipped with overhead trolley wires, in preparation for its reactivation for trolleybuses. On June 5, 1982, it replaced Jefferson Base as the sole trolleybus garage. Jefferson Base was then decommissioned, and eventually it was razed to make way for athletic fields for nearby Seattle University. Central Base's name was later changed back to Atlantic.

Trolley motorization
Safety or routing issues sometimes require Metro to "motorize" the trolleybus routes, operating them with diesel or hybrid diesel-electric buses. These substitutions usually occur on weekends and are usually caused by maintenance on the overhead wires, construction projects near the overhead wires, or special events (such as parades or marathons) that require the routes to be detoured.

See also

 List of trolleybus systems in the United States

References

External links

 
 

Sound Transit
Bus transportation in Washington (state)
Transportation in Seattle
Seattle
Seattle
1940 establishments in Washington (state)